Robert Spencer, 1st Viscount Teviot (baptised 2 February 1629 – 20 May 1694), styled The Honourable Robert Spencer until 1685, was an English politician from the Spencer family who sat in the House of Commons from 1660 to 1679.

Spencer was born at Althorp, a younger son of William Spencer, 2nd Baron Spencer of Wormleighton, and his wife Lady Penelope Wriothesley, daughter of Henry Wriothesley, 3rd Earl of Southampton. Henry Spencer, 1st Earl of Sunderland was his elder brother. He studied at Christ Church, Oxford and was admitted at King's College, Cambridge in 1646. He also studied at the university of Padua in 1648 while travelling in France and Italy, returning to England in 1651.  He was made Doctor of Civil Law (DCL) at Oxford in 1669.

In 1660, Spencer was elected Member of Parliament for Great Bedwyn in the Convention Parliament. In 1661, he was elected MP for Brackley in the Cavalier Parliament and sat until 1679.

He held a number of offices as: commissioner of assessment of taxes in Northamptonshire (1661–74) and Middlesex (1664–69); commissioner for excise appeals (1663–89), joint farmer of Barbados sugar duties (1670–77) and commissioner of the Privy Seal (1685–87).

He was created Viscount Teviot in the Peerage of Scotland on 10 October 1685.

Spencer married Jane Browne born 1860. Children include Elizabeth Long (nee Spencer), Ann Rowland (nee Spencer), James Henry Spencer, and Mary Spriggs (nee Spencer).

References

1629 births
1694 deaths
Viscounts in the Peerage of Scotland
Peers of Scotland created by James VII
Robert
Younger sons of barons
Alumni of Christ Church, Oxford
Alumni of King's College, Cambridge
People from Wiltshire
People from Brackley
English MPs 1660
English MPs 1661–1679
Suicides by sharp instrument in England